Lisa K. Wyatt is an American actress and comedian. According to the biography on her official site, she has appeared in more than 150 film, television and regional theatre credits. In the fifth season of The Office, she appeared as Lynne, the love interest of Kevin Malone.

Education
Wyatt graduated magna cum laude from St. Olaf College in Northfield, Minnesota, with a bachelor's degree in theatre (with a departmental distinction) and math.

Career 
Wyatt has appeared in the films Legally Blonde (2001), Donnie Darko (2001), American Dreamz (2006) and Mr. Woodcock (2007). She had a supporting role in Southland Tales (2006), which premiered at the Cannes Film Festival in 2006. The film was directed by Richard Kelly, who previously directed Wyatt in Donnie Darko. The role of Terri Riley, a soccer mom who becomes a revolutionary, was written specifically for Wyatt.

Wyatt had recurring principal roles in the television shows Days of Our Lives and Passions, and has also made appearances in Ugly Betty, My Name Is Earl, The Suite Life on Deck, Six Feet Under, Frasier, Rules of Engagement and Gilmore Girls. Wyatt has also appeared in commercials, done voice-over work and performed stand-up comedy in several comedy clubs in the Los Angeles area. Along with her husband, Jim Blanchette, she coaches other actors in an acting technique called "The Mechanics of Believability" at the Acting Garage in the Van Nuys district of Los Angeles. Wyatt also designs jewelry for her own company, "Lisa K. Wyatt: Jewelry for all Seasons".

Wyatt previously appeared in a recurring role in NBC's The Office as Lynn, the love interest of Kevin Malone. She first appeared in the episode "Blood Drive", where she meets Kevin at a singles party. Wyatt appeared in the supporting role "Rhonda Martin" in The Box, a horror movie released on November 6, 2009, starring Cameron Diaz, James Marsden and Frank Langella.

Filmography

Film

Television

References

External links

Actresses from Minnesota
American film actresses
American stand-up comedians
American television actresses
American women comedians
Living people
St. Olaf College alumni
Place of birth missing (living people)
Year of birth missing (living people)
20th-century American actresses
21st-century American actresses
20th-century American comedians
21st-century American comedians